The Adams family was a prominent political family in the United States from the late 18th through the early 20th centuries. Based in eastern Massachusetts, they formed part of the Boston Brahmin community. The family traces to Henry Adams of Barton St David, Somerset, in England.  The two presidents and their descendants are also descended from John Alden, who came to the United States on the Mayflower.

The Adams family is one of four families to have produced two presidents of the United States by the same surname; the others were the Bush, Roosevelt, and Harrison families.

John Adams

John Adams was born on October 30, 1735 (October 19, 1735, Old Style, Julian calendar), to John Adams Sr. and Susanna Boylston. He had two younger brothers: Peter (1738–1823) and Elihu (1741–1775). Adams was born on the family farm in Braintree, Massachusetts. His mother was from a leading medical family of present-day Brookline, Massachusetts. His father was a deacon in the Congregational Church, a farmer, a cordwainer, and a lieutenant in the militia. John Sr. served as a selectman (town councilman) and supervised the building of schools and roads. Adams often praised his father and recalled their close relationship. Adams's great-great-grandfather Henry Adams immigrated to Massachusetts from Braintree, Essex, England, around 1638.

Though raised in modest surroundings, Adams felt pressured to live up to his heritage. His family was descended from Puritans, whose strict religious doctrines had profoundly shaped New England's culture, laws, and traditions. By the time of John Adams's birth, Puritan tenets such as predestination had waned and many of their severe practices moderated, but Adams still "considered them bearers of freedom, a cause that still had a holy urgency". Adams recalled that his parents "held every Species of Libertinage in ... Contempt and horror", and detailed "pictures of disgrace, or baseness and of Ruin" resulting from any debauchery. Adams later noted that "As a child I enjoyed perhaps the greatest of blessings that can be bestowed upon men – that of a mother who was anxious and capable to form the characters of her children."

Adams, as the eldest child, was compelled to obtain a formal education. This began at age six at a dame school for boys and girls, conducted at a teacher's home, and was centered upon The New England Primer. Shortly thereafter, Adams attended Braintree Latin School under Joseph Cleverly, where studies included Latin, rhetoric, logic, and arithmetic. Adams's early education included incidents of truancy, a dislike for his master, and a desire to become a farmer. All discussion on the matter ended with his father's command that he remain in school: "You shall comply with my desires." Deacon Adams hired a new schoolmaster named Joseph Marsh, and his son responded positively.

Members

 Henry Adams (1583–1646) born Barton St David, Somerset, England, first of the clan who immigrated to New England, United States.

 John Adams Sr. (1691–1761)
 John Adams (1735–1826), second president of the United States, married Abigail Adams (née Smith) (1744–1818).
 John Quincy Adams (1767–1848), sixth president of the United States, married English-born Louisa Adams (née Johnson) (1775–1852).
 George Washington Adams (1801–1829), member of Massachusetts state legislature.
 John Adams II (1803–1834), private secretary to his father.
 Charles Francis Adams Sr. (1807–1886), U.S. Congressman and Ambassador to the United Kingdom.
John Quincy Adams II (1833–1894), lawyer and politician. His grandson was sociologist George C. Homans.
George Caspar Adams (1863–1900), prominent college athlete and football coach at Harvard University.
  Charles Francis Adams III (1866–1954), 44th Secretary of the Navy, mayor of Quincy, Massachusetts.
  Charles Francis Adams IV (1910–1999), first president of Raytheon.
Charles Francis Adams Jr. (1835–1915), brigadier-general in the Union Army during the American Civil War and president of the Union Pacific Railroad from 1884 to 1890. His granddaughter was artist Mary Ogden Abbott.
John Adams (1875–1964), married Marian Morse.
Thomas Boylston Adams (1910–1997), executive, writer, and political candidate.
 Henry Brooks Adams (1838–1918), prominent author and political commentator, married Marian Hooper Adams (née Hooper) (1843–1885).
  Brooks Adams (1848–1927), historian and political scientist.
 Charles Adams (1770–1800), New York lawyer. His grandson Alexander S. Johnson was a federal judge.
  Thomas Boylston Adams (1772–1832), Massachusetts legislator and judge.
  Elihu Adams (1741–1775), soldier.

 Samuel Adams (1722–1803), revolutionary, delegate to the Continental Congress and governor of Massachusetts, John Adams's second cousin.
 Samuel A. Adams (1934–1988), historian and CIA analyst.
 John Donley Adams (born 1973), American politician and lawyer.
John Quincy Adams (born 1951), American diplomat and U.S. State Department official.

Family religion
Adams was raised a Congregationalist but left the denomination as a young man. By his early 20s, he identified as a Unitarian, a Protestant denomination that had been recently formed.  Adams always felt pressured to live up to his heritage. His family was descended from Puritans, whose strict religious doctrines had profoundly shaped New England's culture, laws, and traditions. By the time of his birth, the Congregationalists no longer called themselves "Puritans"; their severe practices had largely been dropped in the First Great Awakening of the 1730s. Adams praised them historically as bearers of freedom, a cause that still had a holy urgency". Adams recalled that his parents "held every Species of Libertinage in ... Contempt and horror", and detailed "pictures of disgrace, or baseness and of Ruin" resulting from any debauchery. 

According to Dr. Sara Georgini, editor of The John Adams Papers: From John Adams through his grandson Charles Francis, the Adams family creed was conventionally Unitarian. They believed in a guiding Providence. They trusted that human will empowered them to freely accept or reject God’s grace. They turned away from miracles and revelation, preferring biblical criticism and lay inquiry to broaden the mind beyond the passive reception of dogma. Acknowledging Jesus as a “master workman” and gifted  moral teacher, they grew fuzzy about his divinity, opting instead  to scrutinize his teachings and doctrines as they related to contemporary culture. In line with their Protestant peers, most Adamses  mistrusted the sensory emphasis and hierarchical nature of “Romish” Catholicism, but they revered Judaism as a source of lawmaking and ethics.

Family tree
The following is a selective family tree of notable members of the Adams family relative to Charles Francis Adams IV:

Harvard University and the Adams family
The Adams family had an extensive relationship with Harvard University in Cambridge, Massachusetts. The following members of the family attended and graduated from Harvard:
John Adams, class of 1755
John Quincy Adams, class of 1788 and faculty member
Charles Adams, class of 1789
Thomas Boylston Adams, class of 1790
George Washington Adams, class of 1821
John Adams II, expelled with most of senior class prior to 1823 graduation, later among those designated "Bachelor of Arts as of 1823" and added to Harvard's Roll of Graduates
John Quincy Adams II, class of 1853
Charles Francis Adams Sr., class of 1825
Charles Francis Adams Jr., class of 1856
Henry Brooks Adams, class of 1858 and faculty member
Brooks Adams, class of 1870
George Caspar Adams, class of 1886
Charles Francis Adams III, class of 1888
Roger Adams, class of 1909
Charles Francis Adams IV, class of 1932
Thomas Boylston Adams, class of 1933 (did not graduate)
Samuel A. Adams – class of 1955

Adams House, one of 12 residential colleges at Harvard, is named after John Adams and later members of the Adams family.

Memorials
 Adams Memorial
 Adams National Historical Park

See also
 List of United States political families

Notes

References

Further reading

  Excerpt.
 Decker, William Merrill. "Dynasty, Declension, and the Endurance of the House of Adams." Reviews in American History 49.2 (2021): 250-258. online

 Egerton, Douglas R. Heirs of an Honored Name: The Decline of the Adams Family and the Rise of Modern America (Basic Books, 2019). excerpt
 Georgini, Sara. Household Gods: The Religious Lives of the Adams Family (Oxford University Press, 2019) excerpt

 

 Maddox, Robert J. "The Adamses in America". American History Illustrated, Jul 1971, vol. 6, no. 3, pp. 12-21.

 Nagel, Paul C. Descent from Glory: Four Generations of the Adams Family (1983). 
 Nagel, Paul C. The Adams Women: Abigail and Louisa Adams, Their Sisters and Daughters (Harvard University Press, 1999).

Biographies 
 Abrams, Jeanne E. A View from Abroad: The Story of John and Abigail Adams in Europe (NYU Press, 2021).

 
 
 
 
 
 
 
 

 
American families of English ancestry
People from Quincy, Massachusetts
First Families of the United States